Tuff TV was an American digital broadcast television network targeted at men owned by the Tuff TV, Inc. division of Seals Entertainment Corporation. Tuff TV launched on June 30, 2009, and ceased operations August 26, 2018.

Tuff TV carried a mixture of sports (combat, motor and some team sport), lifestyle (outdoors, cooking), automotive, dramas, movies and talk show programming geared mainly at a young male audience. The network carried 3 hours of weekly E/I children's programming to comply with federal broadcasting regulations. Stations affiliating with Tuff received five minutes of local advertising per hour.

History
Tuff TV was launched in 2009 as a joint venture between Luken Communications and TUFF TV Media Group LLC. By July 2011, the network's main affiliate base were the Morris Family Broadcasting and NJR TV station groups. In mid-July 2014, Tuff TV started crowdfunding equity on SparkMarket.com to raise Investment capital, but was limited to those living in the state of Georgia.

Tuff agreed to carry some games from the first season of the Fall Experimental Football League in October and November 2014. Tuff relocated their offices to the GPB Media Building in Atlanta on June 8, 2016. On Friday, July 15, 2016, Tuff took over its distribution feed from Luken Communications earlier than planned.

In 2017 Tuff TV lost a case in civil court for Fair Labor Standards brought by a former employee.

Tuff TV, along with its parent company Seals Entertainment Company, ceased operations without announcement on August 26, 2018. The company eventually acknowledged the shutdown months later and indicated that they hoped to relaunch the channel by March 31, 2019; that date passed without a relaunch or any further news, and the site has only featured text indicating the network would be 'coming soon' with no set launch date. The network later claimed it would relaunch in 2022, but its current live stream is non-functioning, and no details about any new affiliation agreements or distribution details (be it as a broadcast subchannel or streaming network) have been made public.

References

External links
 Seals Entertainment Corporation (Sealsco), parent corporation

Television channels and stations established in 2009
Television channels and stations disestablished in 2018
Sports television networks in the United States
Defunct television networks in the United States
Men's interest channels